Huy Yaleng is a Cambodian film director and actor. As an actor, he acted in The Haunted House.  He worked on Vikaljarek in the capacity of actor and director. Other films from his country that he has worked on include Banana Tree Ghost and Mao Svet (Stingy Person).

Background
Yaleng was born around 1979 and spent time in a refugee camp.

Career

Director
In the 2000s Yaleng was assistant director at CamPro Films.

He directed the film Vikaljarek, which was released on December 2, 2016. It was one of four PuPrum Entertainment films with their trailers shown at a press conference held at the VIP Lounge of Major Cineplex, 2nd Floor AEON Mall on September 19, 2016. It attracted positive attention in China and picked up "The Screening Award" there.

In December 2016, he voiced his displeasure with seeing foreign films getting more attention in his country than locally made films.

Actor
He acted alongside Chan Nary and Prak Sambath in the Heng Tola directed Pteah khmaoch tinh, which was released in 2005. In his film Vikaljarek, he played the part of Sopheap, a Phnom Penh building site worker who suffers from psychotic episodes, and also suffers from bullying at his work with the bullies starting to die.

Filmography (selective)
 Pteah khmaoch tinh (aka The Haunted House)
 Ghost Bought a House
 Ghost is on the Banana Tree
 Mao Svet (Stingy Person)
 Vikaljarek 
 Fathers

References

Cambodian film directors
Cambodian film producers
Cambodian male film actors
1979 births
Living people